Pallidochromis tokolosh is species of cichlid endemic to Lake Malawi where it is only known from deep waters.  This species is piscivorous and can reach a length of  SL.  It is the only known member of its genus. The specific name refers to the  tokoloshe, the name of an evil water spirit in many central African languages, and is an allusion to the bulging eyes, long snout and pot belly of this species when trawled from the great depths and which has inspired many carvings which are sold around the Lake.

References

External links 
 photo of the head

Haplochromini
Fish of Lake Malawi
Taxonomy articles created by Polbot
Taxa named by George F. Turner
Fish described in 1994